Francesco Branciforte Barresi (15 March 1575 – 23 February 1622) was an aristocrat, Marquis of Militello and 4th prince of Butera, as well as a notable patron of the arts and sciences in Sicily.

Biography
He was born in Militello in Val di Catania, the eldest son to Fabrizio, 3rd prince of Butera and his wife Caterina Barresi Branciforte, marchesa of Militello. He was raised in Spain, in the household of his paternal grandmother Dorotea Barresi Santapau, married to the Prince of Pietraperzia. In 1605, Francesco inherited the title of Marchese di Militello. Francesco spent much of his life in Militello, marrying Giovanna d'Austria, daughter of John of Austria. In Militello he patronized a variety of prominent writers and artists, including Pietro Carrera, Filippo Caruso, and Mario Tortelli; the jurist Mario Gastone; the sculptor Giambattista Baldanza; and the painters Filippo Paladini and Mario Minniti. He founded a library and a printing house in town, and founded a Dominican monastery and the Abbey of St Benedict. In 1622, he traveled to Messina to meet the newly appointed Spanish viceroy, Emanuel Philibert of Savoy. In Messina he fell gravely ill and died. Francesco was buried in Militello. His daughter, Margherita Branciforte (1604-1659), married Federico Colonna (1601-1641), but her only offspring died in infancy.

References

1575 births
1622 deaths
People from Militello in Val di Catania
Writers from Sicily
Sicilian nobility